Anthony "Teddy" Akumu Agai (born 20 October 1992) is a Kenyan professional footballer who plays as a midfielder. He will play for J1 League club Sagan Tosu from the 2023 season. He has played for the Kenyan national team.

Career
Born in Rachuonyo, Akumu has played club football for Gor Mahia, Al Khartoum and ZESCO United. In January 2020, he moved to Kaizer Chiefs.

He was announced as the first foreign signing of J1 League club Sagan Tosu, joining the club for the 2023 season.

He made his international debut for Kenya in 2011.

References

1992 births
Living people
People from Homa Bay County
Kenyan footballers
Association football midfielders
Kenya international footballers
Gor Mahia F.C. players
Al Khartoum SC players
ZESCO United F.C. players
Kaizer Chiefs F.C. players
Sagan Tosu players
Kenyan Premier League players
South African Premier Division players
Kenyan expatriate footballers
Kenyan expatriate sportspeople in Sudan
Expatriate footballers in Sudan
Kenyan expatriate sportspeople in Zambia
Expatriate footballers in Zambia
Kenyan expatriate sportspeople in South Africa
Expatriate soccer players in South Africa
Kenyan expatriate sportspeople in Japan
Expatriate footballers in Japan